Pompeu Fabra University is a public university located in the city of Barcelona, Catalonia in Spain. The university was created by the Autonomous Government of Catalonia in 1990 and was named after Pompeu Fabra. UPF has been ranked the best university in Spain since 2015 and 16th best young university in the world in 2022 by the Times Higher Education World University Rankings.

Pompeu Fabra University is considered one of the most prestigious universities in Spain. It has occupied first place in the national ranking of scientific productivity since 2009. Academically, the university is known for its selective student admission as more than half of the degrees offered by it have among the highest university entrance grades (selectivitat) in the Catalan university system.

The university excels in national and international rankings especially in the studies of economics, political science, and law. The studies in the field of Economics at UPF have been ranked among the top 50 worldwide, occupying the 20th place in Economics and Econometrics in the QS World University Rankings by subject in 2016 and 40th place in Economics & Business in the Times Higher Education Rankings. The university's Faculty of Economics and Business Sciences is the first and only faculty in Spain (public or private and for any discipline) to be awarded the Certificate for Quality in Internationalization granted by a consortium of 14 European accreditation agencies. UPF was designated as an "International Excellence Campus" by the Spanish Ministry of Education in 2010.

Campuses

The university offers its studies around three areas of knowledge, each one developed on a different campus: 
 the social sciences and humanities (Citadels Campus, next to Parc de la Ciutadella)
 the health and life sciences (Mar Campus, next to the Port Olímpic)
 the ICT and communication sciences (Poblenou Campus, next to the Can Framis Museum)

Teaching
Specifically, teaching is organized in seven faculties and one engineering school: 
 Faculty of Health and Life Sciences
 Faculty of Economics and Business
 Faculty of Political and Social Sciences
 Faculty of Communication
 Faculty of Law
 Faculty of Humanities
 Faculty of Translation and Language Sciences
 Engineering School

Higher education affiliated centers
Finally, the university also has several higher education affiliated centers: 
 Institut Barcelona d'Estudis Internacionals (IBEI)
 Tecnocampus
 UPF Barcelona School of Management
 International Trade Business School (ESCI)
 Mar University School of Nursing (ESIM)

Research 

Research is organized in eight departments: 
 Department of Experimental and Health Sciences
 Department of Political and Social Sciences
 Department of Communication
 Department of Law
 Department of Economics and Business
 Department of Humanities
 Department of Information and Communications Technologies
 Department of Translation and Language Sciences

Moreover, in order to promote research and transfer activities undertaken by university researchers and provide them with greater international visibility, the university is developing the UPF Research Park in the fields of social sciences, humanities, communication and information technologies. The UPF Research Park, which develops its activity at Ciutadella and Poblenou Campuses, coordinates its activities in the fields of health and life sciences with the Barcelona Biomedical Research Park (PRBB), located at Mar Campus.

University institutes and research centres 

 Institut Barcelona d'Estudis Internacionals (IBEI) (interuniversity research institute)
 UPF-Centre for Animal Ethics (UPF-CAE) (think tank)
 Institut Universitari de Cultura (IUC) (research institute)
 Music Technology Group (MTG) (research group)
 Science Communication Observatory (OCC) (special research centre)
 Hospital del Mar Medical Research Institute (IMIM) (attached research university institute)
 Centre for Genomic Regulation (CRG) (attached research university institute) 
 Barcelona School of Economics (BSE) (attached research university institute)
 Barcelona Institute for Global Health (ISGlobal) (attached research university institute)
 Institute of Evolutionary Biology (IBE) (joint research institute)
 Research Centre for International Economics (CREI) (participated research centre)
 Institute for Political Economy and Governance (IPEG) (participated research centre)
 BarcelonaBeta Brain Research Center (participated research centre)
 Phonos Foundation (associated research centre)

Research Centre for International Economics 
The Research Centre for International Economics (Centre de Recerca en Economia Internacional (CREI)) is a research institute sponsored by the government of Catalonia (Generalitat de Catalunya) and the UPF led by the economist Jordi Galí. Its headquarters is on the campus of UPF in Barcelona, near the Department of Economics and Business at UPF (Ciutadella Campus), which collaborates in many research and teaching fields.

The research activities are focused on international economics and macroeconomics (including growth, business cycles, monetary economics, macroeconometrics, trade and international finance, economic geography, etc.). It tries to emphasize these fields of studies in the European dimension.

Governance
Enric Argullol served as rector from the founding until June 2001, followed by M. Rosa Virós i Galtier (2001-2005), Josep Joan Moreso (2005-2013) and Jaume Casals (2013-2021). The current rector, Oriol Amat, was elected in May 2021.

Rankings
The position of UPF is presented in the following international rankings: Times Higher Education (THE), Quacquarelli Symonds (QS), the one published by Shanghai University (ARWU) , U-Multirank (promoted by the EU), and the Leiden ranking, which is focused on research.

Notable alumni
Rita Almeida, economist
Pol Antràs, economist and professor at Harvard
Elsa Artadi, economist, academic and politician
Meritxell Batet, jurist and politician
Javier Beltrán, film and theatre actor
Genís Boadella, lawyer and politician
David Bonneville, London-based filmmaker
Gloria Aura Bortolini; journalist, photographer and filmmaker
Antonio Briceño, photographer
Javier Calvo, writer
Diego Comin, economist
Lluís Galter, cinema director 
Berta García Faet, poet, translator, and scholar of Hispanic Literature
Uri Giné, musician 
Míriam Hatibi, data analyst and activist
Joan Herrera i Torres, lawyer and politician
Teresa Colom i Pich, poet and novelist
Tatiana Huezo, film director of Salvadoran and Mexican nationality
Isaki Lacuesta, film director
Oliver Laxe, film director, screenwriter and actor
Sergi Miquel, politician
Carles Mundó,  lawyer and politician
Neus Munté, politician
Mónica Ojeda, Ecuadorian writer
Martha Lucía Ospina Martínez, first woman director of Colombia's Instituto Nacional de Salud 
Marta Pascal, politician
Marta Rosique, politician
Gabriel Rufián, politician 
Sandra Sabatés, journalist
Uwe Sunde, German economist
Roger Torrent, politician and urban planner
Nicole Vanden Broeck, filmmaker
Mireia Vehí, sociologist and politician
Alexia Putellas, footballer
Valeria Zalaquett, Chilean photographer and portraitist
Kenmochi Hideki, inventor of Vocaloid

Notable faculty
Maria Teresa Cabré, linguist
Jaume Casals, philosopher
Josep Joan Moreso, legal scholar
Vicenç Navarro, sociologist
Xavier Sala-i-Martin, economist 
Eugenio Trías Sagnier, philosopher
Teun A. van Dijk, linguist
Xavier Serra, music technology scholar
Andreu Mas-Colell, economist
Jordi Galí, economist
Sergi Jordà, music technology scholar
Paul Verschure, cognitive systems and neuro-robotics 
Lydia Zimmermann, filmmaker
Gøsta Esping-Andersen, sociologist
Guillem López Casasnovas, economist
Xavier Freixas, economist
Ricardo Baeza-Yates, computer scientist

References

External links
 The university's English-language web site
 UPF's International Excellence Campus official website

 
Education in Barcelona
Educational institutions established in 1990
1990 establishments in Catalonia
Buildings and structures in Barcelona
Universities and colleges in Spain